The Wisconsin Philosophical Association (WPA) is a philosophical organization. Since the 1970s it has regularly held annual conferences at a Wisconsin university or college, including (in the last decade or two) at UW Madison, UW Milwaukee, UW Oshkosh, UW Stevens Point, Marquette University and Mount Mary University (both in Milwaukee). Because the organization is ad hoc and depends entirely on volunteers drawn from the Wisconsin philosophical community, the conferences have varied in format, sometimes including commentators and/or keynote speakers, sometimes not. However, submissions for the conference have always been peer-reviewed by professional philosophers working at academic institutions in Wisconsin.

According to Dr. Marshall Missner (Professor Emeritus at UW Oshkosh), the WPA can be traced back at least to the 1970s, when it was organized by Dr. Richard Feldman at UW Stevens Point. In those days it was a small conference at which there would be only five or so refereed papers and commentators. For several years the meetings were held at Stevens Point, due mostly to its central location in Wisconsin and the organizational role of Dr. Feldman. Subsequently, philosophers at other campuses, including at UW La Crosse, UW Oshkosh, and Mount St. Mary's, volunteered to organize the conference. Sometimes philosophers on two campuses have split the organizational chores, one campus evaluating submissions and creating the program, the other hosting. The conference has also grown significantly in size. For instance, at the 2019 WPA Conference, which was organized by philosophers at UW La Crosse and hosted at Mount St. Mary's University, there were thirty-five presentations made across five concurrent sessions. In 2020, philosophers at UW Oshkosh are handling both tasks, and the conference is expected to be of a similar size.

The 2020 Wisconsin Philosophical Association Conference was originally scheduled to be held April 25, 2020, in Sage Hall on the UW Oshkosh campus. However, due to the COVID-19 pandemic, it had to be cancelled as a face-to-face meeting. It was held online August 8 and 9 2020.

References 

Philosophical societies in the United States
Organizations based in Wisconsin